God's Property is a collaboration studio album by God's Property, as well as Kirk Franklin's fourth album. It was released on May 27, 1997.  At the time of its release, urban contemporary gospel had gained massive ground in the music industry, thus sending the album to its third position peak on the Billboard 200 album chart and making it the first gospel album to top the Top R&B/Hip-Hop Albums chart, where it reached number one on five nonconsecutive weeks.

Track listing

Chart performance and RIAA certification 
The album debuted at #3 on the Billboard 200 with first week sales of 119,000 copies, making it the highest charting gospel album at the time (until Marvin Sapp's Here I Am debuted at #2 in 2010). It was also #1 on the Top R&B/Hip-Hop Albums chart for 5 non-consecutive weeks making it the first gospel album ever to top that chart. It was also #1 on the Top Gospel Albums chart for 42 consecutive weeks also making it the longest streak at #1 on that chart, and the album would remain on the chart for 105 weeks total. In October 2001 the album was certified triple platinum with over 3 million copies sold across the United States.

Charts

Weekly charts

Year-end charts

Singles chart positions

"Stomp"

Personnel
Musicians
Kirk Franklin: Piano/Organ
Keith Taylor: Bass
David "Paco" Cruz: Electric Guitar
Bobby Sparks: Keyboards
Shaun Martin: Keyboards/Organ
Robert "Sput" Searight: Drums/Keyboards
Jerome Harmon: Organ
Lawrence Ferrell: Drums
R.C. Williams: Organ/Keyboards
Jerriel Carter: Trumpet
Jason Davis: Saxophone
Derrick Harris: Saxophone

See also
List of number-one R&B albums of 1997 (U.S.)

References

Kirk Franklin albums
1997 albums